In enzymology, a lipopolysaccharide glucosyltransferase II is an enzyme that catalyzes the chemical reaction

UDP-glucose + lipopolysaccharide  UDP + alpha-D-glucosyl-lipopolysaccharide

Thus, the two substrates of this enzyme are UDP-glucose and lipopolysaccharide, whereas its two products are UDP and alpha-D-glucosyl-lipopolysaccharide.

This enzyme belongs to the family of glycosyltransferases, specifically the hexosyltransferases.  The systematic name of this enzyme class is UDP-glucose:galactosyl-lipopolysaccharide alpha-D-glucosyltransferase. Other names in common use include uridine diphosphoglucose-galactosylpolysaccharide, and glucosyltransferase.

References

 

EC 2.4.1
Enzymes of unknown structure